The 2014 Extreme Rules was the sixth annual Extreme Rules professional wrestling pay-per-view and livestreaming event produced by WWE. It took place on May 4, 2014, at the Izod Center in East Rutherford, New Jersey, and was the first Extreme Rules event to air on the WWE Network, which launched in February. The concept of Extreme Rules is that the event features various hardcore-based matches.

Eight professional wrestling matches were contested at the event, including one on the Kickoff pre-show. Only three matches, including the pre-show match, were contested under a hardcore stipulation. In the main event, Daniel Bryan defeated Kane in an Extreme Rules match to retain the WWE World Heavyweight Championship. In another prominent match, The Shield (Dean Ambrose, Seth Rollins, and Roman Reigns) defeated the reunited Evolution (Triple H, Randy Orton, and Batista) in a six-man tag team match. 

The event received 108,000 buys (excluding WWE Network views), down from the previous year's 231,000 buys.

Production

Background 
Extreme Rules is an annual gimmick pay-per-view (PPV) produced by WWE since 2009. The concept of the show is that the event features various matches that are contested under hardcore rules and generally features one Extreme Rules match. The defunct Extreme Championship Wrestling promotion, which WWE acquired in 2003, originally used the "extreme rules" term to describe the regulations for all of its matches; WWE adopted the term and has since used it in place of "hardcore match" or "hardcore rules". The 2014 Extreme Rules event was the sixth event under the Extreme Rules chronology. It took place on May 4, 2014, at the Izod Center in East Rutherford, New Jersey. In addition to traditional PPV, it was also the first Extreme Rules to air on WWE's online streaming service, the WWE Network, which launched in February.

Storylines 
The card consisted of eight matches, including one on the Kickoff pre-show. The matches resulted from scripted storylines, where wrestlers portrayed villains, heroes, or less distinguishable characters in scripted events that built tension and culminated in a wrestling match or series of matches, with results predetermined by WWE's writers. Storylines between the characters played out on WWE's primary television programs, Monday Night Raw and SmackDown.

Fresh off his win at WrestleMania, John Cena continued to feud with Bray Wyatt of The Wyatt Family. Cena called Wyatt out for his inability to physically defend himself and his cryptic messages without Luke Harper and Erick Rowan by his side. To make Wyatt prove himself, Cena challenged him to a steel cage match, which Wyatt accepted. On the April 28, 2014 episode of Raw, Cena entered the steel cage to address Wyatt's evil message saying that it has begun to spread amongst the audience, only to be greeted by Wyatt and a children's choir singing "He's Got the Whole World in His Hands" with many Wyatt Family supporters singing along. As the children surrounded the ring, the lights went out before coming back on, with the children now wearing sheep masks as Wyatt laughed maniacally with a child on his lap.

On Raw the day after WrestleMania XXX, Triple H forced Daniel Bryan to defend his newly won WWE World Heavyweight Championship against him. However, Triple H's former bodyguards, The Shield, turned on him and attacked him, resulting in a no contest. As a result, Triple H reformed Evolution with Batista and Randy Orton and attacked The Shield the following week on Raw. On the April 18 edition of SmackDown, Triple H scheduled a six-man tag team match between Evolution and The Shield for Extreme Rules. On the Raw before Extreme Rules, Ric Flair, once part of Evolution, came out only to give his endorsement to the Shield, acknowledging them as the future of the WWE.

On the April 7 edition of Raw, AJ Lee was bragging about having defended her title against 13 other divas at WrestleMania XXX when NXT Women's Champion Paige came out to congratulate AJ on her title defense. AJ then slapped Paige and challenged her to a match for AJ's Divas Championship. The match itself was dominated by AJ until Paige escaped AJ's submission move, the Black Widow, and hit one of her finishing moves, the Paige Turner, to win her first WWE Divas Championship. On the April 15 episode of WWE Main Event, AJ's bodyguard, Tamina Snuka, won a battle royal to become number one contender to Paige's title, allowing her to wrestle Paige for the championship at Extreme Rules.

On the Raw after WrestleMania XXX, Cesaro replaced his manager Zeb Colter with Paul Heyman. This started a rivalry between Heyman and Colter, and by extension between Cesaro and his former tag team partner, Jack Swagger, who was still managed by Colter. Both wrestlers were entered into the tournament to determine Big E's challenger. Prior to Cesaro's semi-final match against Rob Van Dam, Van Dam badmouthed Heyman and advised Cesaro to stay away from him. Van Dam beat Cesaro via count-out after interference from Swagger and Colter. The following week on Raw, Colter approached Van Dam and suggested that he and Swagger team up to take on a common enemy in Heyman, but Van Dam declined. Van Dam later lost the tournament final to Bad News Barrett after interference from Cesaro; Swagger then appeared, attacked Cesaro and attempted to attack Van Dam before being fought off. This set up a triple-threat match between Cesaro, Swagger and Van Dam at Extreme Rules.

On the April 21 episode of Raw, Bryan and Brie Bella were getting ready to celebrate their marriage when Stephanie McMahon came out and scheduled Bryan to defend his WWE World Heavyweight Championship against Kane at Extreme Rules. Kane then came out from the audience and attacked Bryan, giving him three Tombstone Piledrivers – the first on the floor, the second on the steel steps, and the third on the broadcast table, resulting in Bryan being stretchered out of the arena. One week later, during Brie Bella's match with Paige, Kane came up through a hole from underneath the ring and attempted to pull Brie down with him but she got away.

Alexander Rusev made his main roster debut on April 7 and scored victories over various superstars, including R-Truth and Xavier Woods. He also attacked both competitors after their respective matches. This set up a 2-on-1 Handicap match with Rusev against R-Truth and Woods at the pay-per-view.

On May 2 edition of SmackDown, El Torito and Hornswoggle signed the contract for a WeeLC match - a Tables, Ladders, and Chairs match featuring midget wrestlers, with reduced size tables, ladders, and chairs than a normal such match, for the Kickoff pre-show.

Intercontinental Championship No. 1 Contender's tournament
On the April 14 edition of Raw, a tournament was designed to determine who would challenge Big E for the WWE Intercontinental Championship at the event. The bracket is as listed below:

Event

Broadcasters
The English commentators were Michael Cole, Jerry Lawler and John "Bradshaw" Layfield while there were also Spanish and German commentators ringside. Lilian Garcia and Justin Roberts were ring announcers. The Kickoff pre-show was hosted by a panel of Booker T, Alex Riley, Josh Mathews and Sheamus.

Pre-show
During the Extreme Rules Kickoff pre-show, El Torito faced Hornswoggle in a WeeLC match, a special midget version of a TLC match (as 'wee' is a synonym for 'small' widely used in Scotland). The referee, ring announcer, timekeeper and commentators were midget versions of regular personnel. Torito picked up the victory after a Springboard Seated Senton through a table.

Preliminary matches
The actual pay-per-view opened with a Triple threat elimination match between Cesaro, Jack Swagger and Rob Van Dam. Van Dam pinned Swagger after a Five Star Frog Splash to eliminate Swagger. In the climax, Van Dam performed a Van Daminator into a trash can on Cesaro and attempted a Five Star Frog Splash but Cesaro avoided, causing Van Dam to crash into the trash can. Cesaro performed a Neutralizer onto the trash can on Van Dam to win the match. 

After that, Alexander Rusev took on R-Truth and Xavier Woods in a 2-on-1 Handicap match. Before the match, Rusev attacked Woods, thus taking Woods out of the match. Rusev forced R-Truth to submit to the Accolade to win the match.

In the next match, Big E defended his WWE Intercontinental Championship against Bad News Barrett. The match ended when Barrett performed a Bull Hammer on Big E to win the title.

In the fourth match, The Shield faced Evolution. During the match, Triple H Pedigreed Reigns and Batista pinned Reigns for a near-fall. Orton RKO'd Reigns but Rollins broke up a pinfall by Batista at a two count. Ambrose ran across the announce tables and leapt onto Triple H and Orton. Triple H, Orton, Ambrose and Rollins fought into the arena stands, where Triple H and Orton caused Ambrose to fall down a set of stairs. Triple H and Orton attacked Ambrose until Rollins dove off a balcony onto Triple H and Orton. The ending saw Batista perform a Spinebuster on Reigns and attempt a Batista Bomb on Reigns but Reigns countered and performed a Superman Punch on Batista. Reigns performed a Spear on Batista for the win. 

The fifth match was a Steel cage match between John Cena and Bray Wyatt. During the match, Harper attacked Cena atop the cage, resulting in Harper falling into the cage. Cena performed a Super Attitude Adjustment on Wyatt but Harper broke up the pinfall. Rowan attacked Cena atop the cage but Cena pulled Rowan's beard, causing Rowan to collide with the cage. In the end, Cena performed a Diving Leg Drop Bulldog on Harper and attempted to escape through the door but the arena lights went off. When the arena lights turned on, a demonic child appeared, singing "He's Got the Whole World in His Hands". Wyatt performed Sister Abigail on Cena and escaped through the door to win the match.

In the penultimate match, Paige defended her WWE Divas Championship against Tamina Snuka. In the end, Tamina attempted a Superkick but Paige countered and forced Tamina  to submit to the PTO, retaining the title.

Main event
In the main event, Daniel Bryan defended the WWE World Heavyweight Championship against Kane in an Extreme Rules match. During the match, Bryan and Kane fought backstage, where Bryan attacked Kane with a snow shovel. Bryan placed Kane on a forklift and drove the forklift into the arena, where Bryan performed a Diving Headbutt off the forklift on Kane for a near-fall. Kane performed a Chokeslam on Bryan for a near-fall. Kane attempted a Tombstone Piledriver onto a chair on Bryan but Bryan countered into a DDT on the chair for a near-fall. Bryan applied the Yes Lock using a kendo stick but Kane escaped the hold. Bryan attempted a Suicide Dive on Kane but Kane countered and performed a Chokeslam on Bryan through an announce table. Kane retrieved a table and set the table on fire using lighter fluid but Bryan pulled the ring ropes, causing Kane to fall through the table. Bryan performed a Running Knee on Kane to retain the title.

Aftermath 
At the start of Raw after Extreme Rules, Dean Ambrose was forced to defend his United States Championship in a 20-man Battle royal. Ambrose made it to the end with Sheamus, Sheamus eliminated Ambrose to win his second United States Championship, ending Ambrose's reign at 351 days. The Shield then fought The Wyatt Family later in the night; just as things turned in The Shield's favor, Evolution came out and distracted The Shield, allowing The Wyatt Family to win the match. Evolution then assaulted The Shield, and humiliated them by performing The Shield's signature Triple Powerbomb to Roman Reigns. This led to The Shield challenging Evolution to a rematch at Payback, which they accepted. The match was made a No Holds Barred Elimination match.

Cena's feud with Wyatt continued with a Last Man Standing match being set up for Payback. At the pay-per-view, Cena defeated Wyatt to win the match and end their feud.

On the May 12 episode of Raw, Daniel Bryan announced that he would undergo neck surgery, and would be absent from WWE for an unspecified amount of time. That same night, Stephanie McMahon called Bryan to the ring, before Kane dragged him out into the entrance before being loaded onto a stretcher by medical personnel. On May 15, Bryan underwent successful neck surgery, with a cervical foraminotomy to decompress the nerve root having been performed. On the May 19 edition of Raw, Stephanie McMahon gave Bryan an ultimatum to surrender the WWE World Heavyweight Championship the following week on Raw. Bryan replied next week on Raw that he wouldn't surrender it. McMahon then retaliated saying that she would give until Payback to surrender the title. If he didn't surrender, his wife Brie Bella will be fired. At Payback, Brie would let Bryan keep the championship by quitting WWE, and finalized it by slapping McMahon across the face.

Results

Triple Threat Eliminations

References

External links 
 Extreme Rules website

2014 in New Jersey
2014
Events in East Rutherford, New Jersey
2014 WWE Network events
Professional wrestling in East Rutherford, New Jersey
2014 WWE pay-per-view events
May 2014 events in the United States

de:WWE#Pay-per-Vie